Pacific Truck & Trailer Limited was a Vancouver, Canada based manufacturer of heavy trucks famed for their durability. Pacific built both highway and off-road trucks, particularly for the logging industry, heavy haulers, and fire trucks.

In 1947, three former Hayes Truck employees set up their truck-building shop, Pacific Truck & Trailer. Initially based on a shipping wharf at West Coast Shipyards on False Creek, in 1948 it moved to Franklin Street, East Vancouver. In 1967 it moved to North Vancouver. By this stage, it had manufactured 350 trucks and many trailers. In 1970, the business was sold to International Harvester. International managed worldwide sales, but left Pacific the design and manufacture of the products; however, some of the Pacific models featured International cabins.

In 1981, International Harvester sold Pacific Truck and Trailer to Inchcape Berhad (Singapore). In October 1991, the last Pacific truck was built and the manufacturing plant was closed and torn down, with only the parts department left in operation in Vancouver. In 1994, the remnants of the company were sold to Crane Carrier Company of Tulsa, Oklahoma, USA.  Crane continued until 2002, selling the Pacific name, intellectual property, and rights to Coast Powertrain of New Westminster, British Columbia, Canada.

In addition to the Canadian and USA markets, Pacific was selling too in Australia, New Zealand, and South East Asia. However, its most impressive order was for four ultra-heavy road tractors to pull massive loads of up to 370 tons for the South African Railways. These units were delivered in 1972, featured 600  hp Cummins engines, and were known as the "largest on-highway trucks in the world". Sometimes they all worked coupled forming an extra-long road train, including an extra-capacity lowloader trailer to total 860 tons gross combination mass.

The well-known World War II M25 Tank Transporter (also known as Dragon Wagon) truck, commonly referred to as Pacific was not a product of Pacific Truck and Trailer but of Pacific Car and Foundry.

Again, the well-known Pacific School Coch was a Kenworth model CT school bus, made from 1949 onwards; Kenworth itself being a subsidiary of Paccar since 1945.

References

External links
Current Pacific trucks rights owner website
Pacific trucks Club

Truck manufacturers of Canada
Vehicle manufacturing companies established in 1947
1947 establishments in British Columbia
Manufacturing companies based in Vancouver